Marguerin de la Bigne was a French theologian and patrologist and first publisher of the complete works of Isidore of Seville.

He studied at the College of Caen, and at the Sorbonne in Paris where he received the doctorate. He was named canon of his native Diocese of Bayeux and, later, dean of the church of Mans. At the Provincial Council of Rouen, in 1581, he sustained the rights of his cathedral chapter against Bernadin de St. François, Bishop of Bayeux, and provoked an unfortunate conflict with the latter which ended in de la Bigne's resignation from his canonry. He resumed, then, at the Sorbonne the patristic studies in which he had been long engaged. He had early perceived that Protestant misquotation and misinterpretation of patristic texts was a menace to Catholic interests and resolved to collect and edit the available documents of the Fathers. He published in 1575 his "Sacra Bibliotheca Sanctorum Patrum" (Paris, 8 vols.; additional volume in 1579; later editions, Paris, 1589; Lyons, 27 vols., 1677; Cologne, 1694). It contains the writing, some complete, some fragmentary, of our two hundred Fathers, many published for the first time. Particular care was given to the elucidation of texts corrupted by heretics. This work was the pioneer in the field of critical patristics. He published, also "Statuta Synodalia Parisiensium Episcoporum, Galonis Adonis et Willilmi; item Decreta Petri et Galteri, Senonensium Episcoporum" (Paris, 1578); and an edition of St. Isidore of Seville (Paris, 1580), in which for the first time the latter's works were gathered in one work.

External links
 Catholic Encyclopedia Article at newadvent.org

References

16th-century French Catholic theologians
1546 births
1595 deaths